The 1987 Stanley Cup Finals was the championship series of the National Hockey League's (NHL) 1986–87 season, and the culmination of the 1987 Stanley Cup playoffs. It was contested between the Edmonton Oilers and the Philadelphia Flyers. The Oilers won the series 4–3, for their third Stanley Cup victory. This was the sixth of nine consecutive Finals contested by a team from Western Canada, the fifth of eight consecutive Finals contested by a team from Alberta (the Oilers appeared in six, the Calgary Flames in two, the Vancouver Canucks in one), and the fourth of five consecutive Finals to end with the Cup presentation on Alberta ice (the Oilers won four times, the Montreal Canadiens once). Game 7 of this series was played on May 31, which at the time was the latest finishing date for an NHL season. The record would be broken five years later when that series ended on June 1.

Paths to the Finals

For the third straight year, the Edmonton Oilers and Philadelphia Flyers finished the regular season with the two best records in the NHL. While the Oilers' success came from their vaunted offense, the Flyers relied on grit, defensive play, and solid goaltending from Vezina Trophy winner Ron Hextall.

The Oilers cruised into the Finals with relative ease, losing only two games in the process. They beat the Los Angeles Kings in five games, swept the Winnipeg Jets, and then beat the Detroit Red Wings in five to win the Clarence S. Campbell Bowl for the fourth time in five years. The Flyers, meanwhile, had a much harder road. It took them six games to knock off the New York Rangers, went the full seven against the New York Islanders, and then beat Montreal, the reigning champion, in six to claim their second Prince of Wales Trophy in three years.

Game summaries
The Oilers and Flyers met in the Finals for the second time in three years. This time, Edmonton was the regular-season champion with 50 wins and 106 points, and Philadelphia was second with 46 wins and 100 points.

This was a rematch of the 1985 Stanley Cup Finals, where the Oilers beat the Flyers in five games. Unlike the 1985 Finals, this series went to seven games. Edmonton took the first two games at home, then split in Philadelphia. However, the Flyers won the next two games, one in Edmonton and one back in Philadelphia by one goal, to force a deciding seventh game. Edmonton won game seven to earn its third Stanley Cup in four seasons.

During the Stanley Cup presentation, Oilers captain Wayne Gretzky would give the Cup to Steve Smith, who one year earlier scored on his own net a goal that led to their downfall against the Calgary Flames, their in-province rivals, in the Smythe Division Final. Ron Hextall would receive the Conn Smythe Trophy for his efforts.

For the first time in the Finals, both starting goalies, Hextall and Grant Fuhr, wore the full fiberglass cage mask which is now required across almost all levels of competitive hockey. Fuhr wore the original face-hugging fiberglass mask in his three previous Finals appearances before switching to the full cage in the 1985–86 season. Patrick Roy was the first goalie to wear the full cage in the Finals when he backstopped the Montreal Canadiens to victory vs. the Calgary Flames the previous year.

Many people consider this to be one of the greatest Stanley Cup Finals of all time.

Game one

With the game tied at 1–1 after 40 minutes of play, the Oilers won thanks to third-period goals by Glenn Anderson, Paul Coffey, and Jari Kurri. Gretzky registered a goal and an assist in the onslaught as part of a 4–2 win. The Flyers outshot Edmonton 31–26.

Game two

This time, the Flyers led 2–1 after two periods. Despite matching the Oilers line for line and speed for speed, Edmonton burned Philly with a third-period goal, then on the game-winner by Kurri, who took advantage of some disorganized defensive play by the Flyers in overtime to score the game-winning goal with a wide-open chance in a 3–2 overtime victory.

Game three

Looking to take a commanding 3–0 series lead, Edmonton came out firing, taking a 2–0 lead after one period on goals by Mark Messier and Coffey, then stretching it to 3–0 on Anderson's fluke breakaway goal 1:49 into the second.

With their backs against the wall, the Flyers began a comeback on second-period goals by Murray Craven and Peter Zezel. Early in the third, tallies 17 seconds apart by Scott Mellanby and Brad McCrimmon tied the game, then put the Flyers ahead 4–3. For the remainder of the period, the Flyers gamely kept the Oilers' potent offense at bay until Brian Propp's empty-net goal sealed a 5–3 win.

Until this point, no team had ever rebounded from a 3–0 deficit to win a game in the Finals, and the Flyers won their first-ever playoff game after yielding a game's first three goals.

Game four

The momentum from game three did not carry over for Philadelphia. Gretzky notched three assists as the Oilers won, 4–1, and took a three games to one series lead. In a relatively sedate affair, the most shocking event came when Flyers goaltender Ron Hextall viciously chopped his stick across the back of the legs of Edmonton's Kent Nilsson in the third period when trailing 4–1. Hextall was apparently incensed that Anderson and other Oilers had cruised through the goal crease untouched and unpenalized during the game, and took out his frustration on the last Oiler he happened to see skate by. Hextall's actions caused Nilsson no injury, but Hextall would be suspended for the first eight games of the  season.

Game five

Edmonton's newspapers had published plans for a future victory parade that day, and the Oilers tried to make those plans come to fruition when they beat Hextall for two quick first-period goals. Although the Flyers got one back and trailed 2–1 after one period, Hextall let Edmonton's third goal of the game, a tip-in by Marty McSorley with nearly two minutes gone in the second slip between his arm and body; time was growing short.

Facing the end of their season, the Flyers clawed back and tied the game 3–3 on goals by Doug Crossman and Pelle Eklund. With almost six minutes played in the third, Propp fed Rick Tocchet in the slot for the go-ahead score. Hextall and the Flyers' defence clamped down on the Oilers the rest of the way and the series came back to Philadelphia.

Game six

With a chance to close out the series without the pressure of home ice, Edmonton took a 2–0 lead against a hesitant Flyers club on a disputed goal by Kevin Lowe and a stuffer by checking winger Kevin McClelland. The Oilers took control of the game in all aspects, outshooting Philly 15–5 in the opening 20 minutes. The Flyers had little chance until Lindsay Carson managed to thread a puck through Grant Fuhr's pads a little more than seven minutes into the second period. The Oilers kept the pressure on, and carried play into the third period. However, Anderson's careless high-sticking penalty with eight minutes left in regulation led to Propp's electric game-tying goal, snapping a shot high into the left corner of the net.

Eighty-four seconds later, little-used Flyer defenceman J. J. Daigneault stepped up to a dying puck inside the Oilers' blue line, and cranked the puck just inside the right post to give the Flyers a 3–2 advantage. Daigneault's goal stirred the Spectrum crowd to a frenzy providing what has been called the loudest moment in that arena's history, and the game is often nicknamed "The Night the Spectrum Shook". The only threat to that lead came with ten seconds left, when Mark Messier picked off Hextall's attempted clear, broke in, and took one shot into Hextall's pads and a second over the top of the net. Mark Howe knocked down a last-ditch Oiler effort at the buzzer, and the Finals headed to a seventh game for the first time since .

Game seven

Two unusual occurrences marked the opening of the game, which marked the first game 7 since 1971: the Flyers were awarded a two-man advantage one minute into the contest, and scored the first goal of the game for the first time in the Finals. Craven banked a shot off Fuhr's skate only 1:41 into the game for a 1–0 Philadelphia lead. The Flyers failed to score on the back half of the 5-on-3, and the Oilers came back six minutes later when Messier finished off a 3-on-1 with a backhander to tie the game. Kurri delivered a huge blow to Flyers victory hopes when he beat Hextall with quick wrist shot off a Gretzky pass at 14:59 into the second period, giving the Oilers a one-goal cushion. Edmonton poured it on late, outshooting the Flyers 13–6 in the middle 20 minutes and 12–2 in the third, finally getting an insurance goal on Anderson's 30-footer up the middle with 2:24 to play.

Philadelphia's Hextall, who had 40 saves in game seven, was awarded the Conn Smythe Trophy as the playoffs MVP despite Edmonton's victory. His feat was the fourth time a Conn Smythe winner came from a losing team. Jean-Sebastien Giguere, also a goalie, would become the  playoff MVP with the Finals-losing Mighty Ducks of Anaheim.

This is the most recent game seven in the Finals to have a lead change, or even a game-tying goal. All eight such games played since then (1994, 2001, 2003, 2004, 2006, 2009, 2011, and 2019) had neither. This was also the last time that the champs would skate off with the Cup after winning the trophy. When the Oilers repeated the next year, they started the tradition in which everyone gathered around with the Cup in a team photo.

Broadcasting
In the United States, the series aired nationally on ESPN. However, ESPN's national coverage was blacked out in the Philadelphia area due to the local rights to Flyers games in that TV market. WGBS aired four games at the Northlands Coliseum while PRISM televised three games at the Spectrum.

In Canada, this was the first of two consecutive years that the English-language rights to the Cup Finals was split between the Global-Canwest consortium and the CBC. The CBC exclusively aired games one, two and six, while Global exclusively televised games three, four, and five. Game seven was then broadcast simultaneously by both networks, with each broadcaster using its own separate production facilities and on-air talent.

Team rosters

Edmonton Oilers

|}

Philadelphia Flyers

|}

Stanley Cup engraving
The 1987 Stanley Cup was presented to Oilers captain Wayne Gretzky by NHL President John Ziegler following the Oilers 3–1 win over the Flyers in game seven.

The following Oilers players and staff had their names engraved on the Stanley Cup

1986–87 Edmonton Oilers

See also
 1986–87 NHL season
 List of Stanley Cup champions

Notes

References

 
Stan
Stanley Cup Finals
Edmonton Oilers games
Philadelphia Flyers games
May 1987 sports events in Canada
Ice hockey competitions in Edmonton
Ice hockey competitions in Philadelphia
1987 in sports in Pennsylvania
1980s in Philadelphia
1980s in Edmonton
1987 in Alberta